ARA General San Martín was the first icebreaker of the Argentine Navy. She participated in several Antarctic campaigns of Argentina between 1954 and 1982. She received the name of José de San Martín.

For twenty-five years she drew his sea routes in the southern seas, which enabled the summer and winter campaigns. She carried out numerous research and relief assistance missions to ships, navigators and expeditionaries; she facilitated the foundation of refuges and Antarctic bases, the replacement of the endowments, the exploration of the Weddell Sea and the accomplishment of oceanographic tasks, hydrographic and meteorological investigations in Argentine Antarctica.

Historical record 
The icebreaker General San Martín icebreaker was built at the Bremerhaven shipyard (Germany) by the Seebeckwerft company of Weser A.G., Bremerhaven. The laying of the icebreaker's keel took place on 1 March 1954 and was launched on 24 June 1954. She arrived in Argentina same year under the leadership of the captain Luis Tristán de Villalobos.

She was the first icebreaker of the Argentine Navy. For twenty-five years she has traced maritime routes over the frozen Antarctic seas, making her way to carry out the summer and winter campaigns. For this, she has carried out numerous search and rescue missions to the boat, the navigators and the expeditions; she facilitated the founding of refuges and Antarctic bases, replenishing them, relaying their endowments, exploring the confines of the Weddell Sea and performing oceanographic, hydrographic and meteorological research tasks throughout the world of Argentine Antarctica.

References 

Icebreakers of the Argentine Navy
Ships built in Bremen (state)
Research vessels of Argentina
1954 ships